The discography of American pop singer Donny Osmond contains 18 studio albums, nine compilation albums, one live album, four video albums, three extended plays, four music videos, 25 singles and eight additional appearances. After several years collaborating with his siblings' band, The Osmonds, he embarked on a solo career in 1971. His debut single, "Sweet and Innocent," reached number seven on the Billboard Hot 100 and made him a teen pop star. Its follow-up entitled "Go Away Little Girl" topped the same chart in 1971. Also in 1971 his debut studio album was released called The Donny Osmond Album. It peaked at number 13 on the Billboard 200 all-genre chart. His third studio release, Portrait of Donny, reached number six on the Billboard 200 and is his highest-charting album to date. Its two singles became top ten hits on the pop chart: "Hey Girl" and "Puppy Love." He released his fourth studio effort in 1972, Too Young. The record peaked at number 11 on the Billboard 200. It spawned the top 20 pop hits: the title track and "Why." In 1973, Alone Together marked his fifth studio album release and peaked at number 26 in the United States. It spawned his cover of "The Twelfth of Never," which reached number eight on the Hot 100. By the mid 1970s, Osmond reached adulthood and his career began to decline despite collaborations with his sister, Marie Osmond. In 1976, he recorded an album of disco (Disco Train), which only reached number 145 on the Billboard 200.

Although Osmond continued performing his popularity had declined. Yet, in 1989 he returned with the single "Soldier of Love." It became his biggest hit in over a decade on the Hot 100, reaching number two in 1989. His self-titled studio album was also released in 1989 and peaked at number 54 on the Billboard 200. He followed it with 1990's Eyes Don't Lie, which reached number 177 on the all-genre chart. It spawned the single "My Love Is a Fire," which climbed to number 21 on the Hot 100. He worked on various film, television and theater projects during the remainder of the decade. He then released an album of show-tunes entitled This Is the Moment. The project peaked at number 64 on the Billboard 200 list. He then followed it with a collection of love songs in 2002 called Somewhere in Time. In 2007, Osmond's studio album, Love Songs of the 70's, was his highest-charting record in many years, peaking at number 27 on the all-genre survey. His most recent studio release is a collection of cover tunes, The Soundtrack of My Life.

Albums

Studio albums

Compilation albums

Live albums

Extended plays

Singles

As lead artist

As a featured artist

Videography

Music videos

Other album appearances

See also
 Donny and Marie Osmond discography
 Marie Osmond discography
 The Osmonds discography

Notes

References

External links
 Donny Osmond music at his official website

Discographies of American artists
 
 
Pop music discographies